Tomosvaryella geniculata is a species of fly in the family Pipunculidae.

Distribution
Austria, Belgium, Great Britain, Bulgaria, Canary Islands, Croatia, Czech Republic, Denmark, France, Germany, Hungary, Italy, Latvia, Macedonia, Madeira Island, Poland, Romania, Slovakia, Spain, Sweden, Switzerland, Netherlands.

References

Pipunculidae
Insects described in 1824
Diptera of Europe
Taxa named by Johann Wilhelm Meigen